Ernesto José Vidal Cassio, "El Patrullero", (November 15, 1921 – February 20, 1974) was an Italian Uruguayan footballer. He was born Ernesto Servolo Pietro Vidal Cassio in Buie d'Istria, Italy (now Croatia).  He was part of the Uruguay national football team in the 1950 World Cup. He also played club football for C.A. Peñarol Montevideo, Rosario Central in Argentina, and Fiorentina of Italy.

References

1921 births
1974 deaths
People from Buje
Istrian Italian people
Italian emigrants to Uruguay
Uruguayan footballers
Uruguayan expatriate footballers
Primera Nacional players
Uruguayan Primera División players
Peñarol players
Rosario Central footballers
Aurora Pro Patria 1919 players
Uruguay international footballers
ACF Fiorentina players
FIFA World Cup-winning players
1950 FIFA World Cup players
Italian footballers
Serie A players
Expatriate footballers in Argentina
Uruguayan expatriate sportspeople in Argentina
Association football forwards